Friends & People is the fifth studio album by  R&B group The Friends of Distinction, released in 1971 on the RCA Victor label.

Commercial performance
The album peaked at No. 166 on the Billboard 200 chart. The album features the single "I Need You", which peaked at #28 on the Hot Soul Singles chart and No. 79 on the Billboard Hot 100.

Track listing

Personnel
Harry Eltson, Floyd Butler, Jessica Cleaves – vocals

Charts

Singles

References

External links 
 

1971 albums
The Friends of Distinction albums
Albums produced by Jerry Peters
RCA Records albums